Hevioso is an African voodoo deity of thunder, worshipped in West Africa.

Hevioso is the God of heaven, thunder, lightning and rain. Known to populations of southern Benin. Hevioso / Hebioso / Shango is a righteous God. He chastises liars, thieves and villains by smiting them. In certain places the bas-reliefs of the temples of Hèvioso represent this God in the form of a man who slaughtered at these feet a living being with an ax.

According to P. Verger, Shango can be described in two aspects, historical or divine. As a historical figure, he would have been the third Alaafin Oyo, king of Oyo, son of Oraniyan and Torosi. Oraniyan was the youngest son of Odudua and became the most powerful of them, the one whose fame was the largest in the Yoruba country. He became famous, from his youth as a hunter, and later on because of the numerous and profitable conquests, he undertook.

He was the founder of the kingdom of Oyo. Torosi, when she was the daughter of Elempe, the king of the country Tapa. Shango grew up in his mother's country and later moved to Koso where people did not want him because of his violent and imperious nature, but he forced himself on them. He then went, followed by these people, to Oyo where he established a neighbourhood called Koso. He thus retained his title of Oba Koso, which later became his Oriki (traditional praise).

At the time Dada Ajaka, Shangang's eldest brother, was on the throne in Oyo. Shango dethroned him but had only reigned for seven years. In his divine aspect, Shango is the husband of Oya, Oshun and Oba. He is virile, robust, violent and vigilant; chastise liars, thieves, and evildoers.

References 

Voodoo deities
Thunder deities
West African Vodun